The twenty-ninth government of Israel was formed by Ariel Sharon on 7 March 2001, following his victory over Ehud Barak in the special election for Prime Minister in February. It was the first, and to date only time an election for Prime Minister was held without parallel elections for the Knesset, and one of the first acts of the new government was to repeal the law which introduced separate elections. Despite his large margin of victory in the election, because there had been no Knesset elections, Sharon's Likud was not the largest party in the Knesset, resulting in the formation of a national unity coalition that at some point included Labor-Meimad (the largest faction in the Knesset), Shas, the Centre Party, the National Religious Party, United Torah Judaism, Yisrael BaAliyah, the National Union-Yisrael Beiteinu, the New Way and Gesher. Shas left the government on 23 May 2002, but returned on 3 June, whilst Labor-Meimad left on 2 November 2002.

The government initially had 26 ministers and 15 deputy ministers, making it the largest in Israeli political history, and resulting in a new $10,000 horseshoe-shaped table having to be installed in the Knesset plenum. There were four Deputy Prime Ministers and eight Ministers without Portfolio during the government's term, during which the total number of ministers rose to 29. Although there had previously been Israeli Arab deputy ministers, with the inclusion of the Druze politician Salah Tarif as  Minister without Portfolio, the twenty-ninth government was the first to have a non-Jewish minister.

The government held office until Sharon formed the thirtieth government on 28 February 2003, following Likud's comprehensive victory in the January elections.

Cabinet members

1 The Shas ministers resigned between 20 and 23 May 2002, but returned to office on 3 June. With the exception of the Jerusalem Affairs portfolio, during their absence, Ariel Sharon took over their positions.

2 Ze'evi was assassinated.

References

External links
Fifteenth Knesset: Government 29 Knesset website

 29
Ariel Sharon
2001 establishments in Israel
2003 disestablishments in Israel
Cabinets established in 2001
Cabinets disestablished in 2003
2001 in Israeli politics
2002 in Israeli politics
2003 in Israeli politics
 29